John David Edward Boyce was formerly Barbados's Minister of Transport and Works and is currently their Minister of Health.

References 

Health ministers of Barbados
Transport ministers of Barbados
Public works ministers of Barbados
Living people
Year of birth missing (living people)
Place of birth missing (living people)